Pablo Alejandro Correa Velázquez (born 14 March 1967) is a Uruguayan former football player. After his retirement as a player, he became the head coach of three French football clubs.

Playing career
Correa started his footballing career as a player in Uruguay, where he played for Nacional, Rentistas, Peñarol and Defensor Sporting.

In 1993, he joined San Lorenzo de Almagro in Argentina, but returned to Uruguay after only 3 games with the club, to join Montevideo Wanderers.

In 1995 Correa moved to France, where he played the remainder of his career in Ligue 1 and Ligue 2 for AS Nancy,. Correa played up front with Tony Cascarino and became a hit with the AS Nancy fans.

Managerial career
After his retirement as a player, he joined the coaching staff at AS Nancy and was appointed as the club manager in 2002.

In the summer of 2005, Correa secured Nancy's promotion to Ligue 1 by winning the 2004–05 Ligue 2 title and after spending the previous five seasons in Ligue 2. Correa guided Nancy to the 2006 Coupe de la Ligue Final final against Nice, in which Nancy won  2–1, giving them a spot in the 2006–07 UEFA Cup. Nancy survived their first Ligue 1 season of the 21st century, finishing in 12th position and notably beating AS Saint-Étienne 2–0 and Rennes 6–0 in home Ligue 1 matches.

On 25 May 2011, Correa announced he would terminate his contract after the end of the season. He had been Nancy's club manager for nine consecutive years since 2002.

On 2 January 2012, Correa was named as new coach of Ligue 1 side Évian Thonon Gaillard F.C., replacing Bernard Casoni. Following a poor start to the 2012–13 season during which the club lost 3 and drew 1 of their first 4 2012–13 Ligue 1 matches, he was sacked on 3 September 2012 and replaced by Pascal Dupraz.

Correa returned to AS Nancy on 12 October 2013 replacing Patrick Gabriel. Following relegation from Ligue 1 in the summer of 2017 and a poor start to the 2017-18 Ligue 2 season, he was sacked on 29 August 2017.

On 20 December 2017, Correa was named new coach of AJ Auxerre. Following a run of four consecutive Ligue 2 defeats, he was sacked on 18 March 2019.

In December 2021, he became new manager of Belgian club R.E. Virton. He left the club in July 2022.

Managerial statistics

References

1967 births
Living people
Association football forwards
Uruguayan footballers
Uruguayan expatriate footballers
Uruguayan football managers
Club Nacional de Football players
Peñarol players
Defensor Sporting players
Montevideo Wanderers F.C. players
San Lorenzo de Almagro footballers
Expatriate footballers in Argentina
Expatriate footballers in France
AS Nancy Lorraine players
Uruguayan Primera División players
Argentine Primera División players
Ligue 1 players
Ligue 2 players
AS Nancy Lorraine managers
Thonon Evian Grand Genève F.C. managers
AJ Auxerre managers
Ligue 1 managers
R.E. Virton managers